The North Carolina Forest Service, formerly known as North Carolina Division of Forest Resources is a North Carolina state government agency responsible for providing land management assistance to landowners. The agency is also responsible for wildland fire control on all state and privately owned land in North Carolina, United States.

The North Carolina Forest Service, was a Division of the N.C. Department of Environment and Natural Resources until July 2011 and is now part of the North Carolina Department of Agriculture and Consumer Services.

See also

Government of North Carolina

References

External links
North Carolina Forest Service
North Carolina Department of Agriculture and Consumer Services

Forest Service
State forestry agencies in the United States